The 1972 United States presidential election in North Carolina took place on November 7, 1972, as part of the 1972 United States presidential election. Voters chose 13 representatives, or electors to the Electoral College, who voted for president and vice president.

North Carolina voted strongly for Republican nominee President Richard Nixon, over Democratic nominee Senator George McGovern. North Carolina voted overwhelmingly for President Nixon, who won 69.46% to 28.89%, one of the biggest margins in the country. This is the most Republican result in North Carolina presidential history, which was 17.3% more Republican than the nation-at-large. 

McGovern won only the typically extremely strong Democratic counties of Northampton and Orange – two counties with a record of having voted Democratic at every election since 1912, apart from Orange County’s vote against the Catholic Al Smith in 1928. Even in these counties, where most Democratic candidates expect to receive well over sixty percent of the vote and Walter Mondale in his disastrous 1984 loss won by over 13 percent, McGovern won by only 236 votes in Northampton County and 1,002 out of over 23,000 in Orange County.

In the process Nixon managed to challenge the long-established Democratic bastion in the state’s northeast, which rivals South Texas as the longest-lived extant Democrat stronghold in the entire United States. It is the only time since 1900 that Hoke, Hertford and Bertie Counties have voted against the Democratic candidate, the only time that Durham and Washington Counties has voted for the Republican candidate since 1928, and the only time Halifax, Warren and Edgecombe Counties have supported a Republican candidate since 1896. Anson county had not voted Republican since 1872, and has not done so again.

This is the first election in which a presidential candidate won North Carolina with more than 1,000,000 votes. This is also the best Republican presidential election performance in the history of the state.

Results

Results by county

Notes

References

North Carolina
1972
1972 North Carolina elections